Pontypool was a county constituency in the town of Pontypool in Monmouthshire.  It returned one Member of Parliament (MP)  to the House of Commons of the Parliament of the United Kingdom, elected by the first past the post voting system.

The constituency was created for the 1918 general election, and was replaced with Torfaen for the 1983 general election. This was to correspond with the name and area of the Torfaen local authority created in 1974. The Torfaen constituency contained the whole of the old Pontypool seat, adding just 247 electors from Monmouth.

Boundaries 
1918–1950: The Urban Districts of Abersychan, Blaenavon, Llanfrechfa Upper, Llantarnam, Panteg, and Pontypool.

1950–1983: The Urban Districts of Blaenavon, Cwmbran, and Pontypool.

Members of Parliament

Election results

Elections in the 1910s

Elections in the 1920s

Elections in the 1930s

Elections in the 1940s

Elections in the 1950s

Elections in the 1960s

Elections in the 1970s

References 

History of Monmouthshire
Historic parliamentary constituencies in South Wales
Constituencies of the Parliament of the United Kingdom established in 1918
Constituencies of the Parliament of the United Kingdom disestablished in 1983
Politics of Monmouthshire
Pontypool